Jimmy (formerly Canal Jimmy) is a satellite digital television channel in France and now defunct in Italy and France. It was part of Sky Italia at n.140.

History 
Canal Jimmy was launched on cable on November 29, 1990, by Michel Thoulouze who based the channel on the nostalgia of his adolescence. Canal Jimmy is named after two legends of the 1960s and 1970s: James (Jimmy) Dean and Jimi Hendrix.

On February 14, 1992, Canal Jimmy broadcast its first exclusive series, Dream On. The channel also broadcast many films (the James Dean trilogy - East of Eden, Rebel Without a Cause and Giant, etc.), old popular series (The Invaders, Star Trek, etc.) and exclusive American series in their original version (NYPD Blue for example). The most emblematic series ever broadcast on Jimmy is probably Friends, first broadcast April 16, 1996. The show later made the tour across the French audiovisual landscape: France 2, NRJ 12, France 4, Comédie+, RTL9, AB1, M6, W9, NRJ Paris, D8, NT1 and TMC.

The second area of exploration of Canal Jimmy was music, always in a so-called nostalgic perspective, with the broadcast of programs like Top Bab by Philippe Maneuvre and iconic concerts of the 1960s and 1970s, such as those of The Doors and Jimi Hendrix, as well as the 1970 Isle of Wight Festival.

The channel initially only aired from 8pm to 1am, following the Canal J youth channel which interrupted its programs at the same time. Canal Jimmy was included in the Canalsatellite package when it was created on November 14, 1992. After the launch of the digital version of the package on April 27, 1996, the channel obtained its own slot and expanded its programs for the day.

On November 15th 1997, the channel was launched in Italy. In that country, the channel was closed on January 1st 2011.

On 16 January 2014, Canal+ announced its rebranding of Jimmy as an "antiheroes' channel". For the occasion, a new logo was aired from 18 February 2014, along with a high-definition simulcast on Canalsat platform.

Later that year, in October, Canal+ Group announced the closure of the channel, along with Sport+ and Cuisine+. Jimmy ended broadcasting on 26 June 2015.

Logos

Slogans 
 2007-2014 : "On a tous une série culte".
 2014 : "La chaîne 100% série".
 2014-2015 : "Anti-héros en séries".

External links
 Official site

Sky Italia
RCS MediaGroup
MultiThématiques
Defunct television channels in France
Television channels and stations established in 1990
Television channels and stations disestablished in 2015
1990 establishments in France
2015 disestablishments in France